This is a list of Croatian television related events from 1976.

Events

Debuts
 January 3 - TV kalendar

Television shows

Ending this year

Births
8 April - Nikolina Pišek, actress & TV host
28 September - Dušan Bućan, actor & TV host

Deaths